"So Sexy" is a song by American R&B singer Olivia. It was written by Patrick "J. Que" Smith, Tab Nkhereanye, and Walter Milsap III for her unreleased second studio album, her G-Unit debut Behind Closed Doors. The song was released as the album's second single and peaked at number 60 on the US Billboard Hot 100 and number 30 on the Hot R&B/Hip-Hop Songs chart.

Music video
A music video for "So Sexy" was directed by Marcus Raboy.

Track listing
Digital single
 "So Sexy" – 3:56

Charts

References

2005 singles
Olivia (singer) songs
G-Unit Records singles
2005 songs
Songs written by Patrick "J. Que" Smith